Sankara Lingam Dendapani (born 12 January 1958) is a former Indian cricket umpire. He stood in one ODI game in 1998.

See also
 List of One Day International cricket umpires

References

1958 births
Living people
Indian One Day International cricket umpires
Cricketers from Kochi